The 2011 Donegal Senior Football Championship was contested by senior Gaelic football clubs under the auspices of Donegal GAA. Glenswilly were 2011 Champions, their first ever title. St Michael's also made their first final appearance.

First round
The first round draw was made at the RTÉ Raidió na Gaeltachta studios in Derrybeg.

A brawl among dozens of people after the game between Naomh Conaill and Glenswilly at Davy Brennan Memorial Park led to Leo McLoone breaking several bones in his face and the Donegal Competition's Controls Committee (CCC) launching an investigation. McLoone had to have surgery to have a plate put into his eye socket.

Quarter-finals

Semi-finals
Glenswilly and St Michael's won the semi-finals.

Final
The Final, broadcast on TG4 and contested by Glenswilly and St Michael's, produced a novel pairing as neither side had ever won before and they had only one losing final appearance between them, that of Glenswilly in 2007. Members of the winning team would each receive a personalised medal engraved with both their name and number from county final day.

Glenswilly prevailed on the day, winning the final at MacCumhaill Park in Ballybofey. Michael Murphy scored all but one point of the winning team's total.

References

Donegal Senior Football Championship
Donegal Senior Football Championship